Louis-Étienne Jousserandot (11 May 1813 – 26 April 1887) was a 19th-century French lawyer, journalist and writer. He was prefect of Pyrénées-Orientales then of Marne under the French Third Republic.

Career 
 September 1870 - November 1871: Prefect of Pyrénées-Orientales
 November 1871 - May 1873: Prefect of Marne

Literary activity 
Aa amator of the game of dominoes, Berthoud was a member of the club of  founded circa 1838 in Paris by the sculptor Dantan le Jeune. In 1848, Jousserandot wrote an 11-page epistle in honour of the Deminotiers. It is available on line on the site Gallica of the BNF.

Le Médecin des pauvres, a novel published in 1861 by Xavier de Montépin, was the result of a real plagiarism from a book published in 1844, Le Diamant de la Vouivre by Louis Jousserandot who sued Xavier de Montépin. The latter being a famous writer and well in court and with many strong political support, his opponent could not succeed. Louis Jousserandot's claim was dismissed.

Publications 
1844: Le Diamant de la Vouivre
1845: Le Capitaine Lacuzon; 2 vol., Paris, L. de Potter, 1845, in-8° 
1848: Le domino, épître à Dantan jeune et S.-H. Berthoud., publisher: impr. de Delanchy, Paris 1848, 8 p. ; in-fol

Courses 
Louis Jousserandot, La Civilisation moderne : cours professé à l'Académie de Lausanne, Paris, Didier, 1866, VIII-476 p., In-8°

Essais 
 Louis Jousserandot: Du Pouvoir judiciaire et de son organisation en France, Paris, A. Marescq aîné, 1878, 187 p., In-8°
 Louis Jousserandot: Le Magistrat unique et le jury facultatif, Angers, impr. de A. Dedouvres, 1885, 16 p., In-8°
 Louis Jousserandot: De la Démocratie républicaine, Paris, Chevalier-Marescq, 1886, 84 p., In-8° 
 Louis Jousserandot: Des Assesseurs près des tribunaux romains, Paris, Larose et Forcel, 1886, 21 p., In-8°

Theatre 
1838: Lord Surrey, drame en 5 actes, Paris, Marchant, 28 p., Gr. in-8°
1847: Les Collaborateurs : comédie en 1 acte et en vers, Paris, N. Tresse, 55 p., In-8°

Bibliography 

 Joseph Ramonéda, « Jousserandot, Louis-Étienne », dans La République concordataire et ses curés dans les Pyrénées-Orientales (1870-1905), Presses Universitaires de Perpignan, 2011, 168 p. 
 Max Roche et Michel Vernus, « Jousserandot, Louis-Étienne », dans Dictionnaire biographique du département du Jura, Arts et littérature, 1996, 522 p
 Vincent Wright, « Jousserandot (Louis-Étienne) », dans Les préfets de Gambetta, Presses Paris Sorbonne, 2007, 482 p

References

External links 
 Louis Jousserandot on data.bnf.fr

19th-century French dramatists and playwrights
Prefects of Pyrénées-Orientales
Prefects of Marne (department)
1813 births
People from Lons-le-Saunier
1887 deaths